Alvesta Municipality (Alvesta kommun) is a municipality in Kronoberg County, southern Sweden. Its seat is in Alvesta.

The present municipality was created in 1971, when the market town (köping) Alvesta (instituted in 1945) was amalgamated with four surrounding rural municipalities. Amalgamations had also taken place in 1952 and 1963. The number of original local government entities within the present municipality is twelve.

The municipal arms are from 1951 and depict three bees and a winged wheel. This symbolizes the railway that is so vital for the industry, while the bees signify the hard-working spirit that the locals pride themselves with.

The municipality boasts nature areas and is suitable for fishing, canoeing or playing golf.

The mansion of Huseby is a popular place to visit, located some 15 kilometers south of the town Alvesta, and hosts a couple of museums. There are also old churches scattered around the municipality, some medieval, among them the Alvesta Church.

Localities
There are 6 urban areas (or tätort) in Alvesta Municipality.

In the table the localities are listed according to the size of the population as of December 31, 2005. The municipal seat is in bold characters.

Notable natives
Some well-known natives of Alvesta are the national famous magician Joe Labero and the ATP tennis player Jonas Björkman. The former world #1 in the same sport, Mats Wilander, was originally from Torpsbruk in the north part of the municipality.

Swan J. Turnblad (1860–1933) American newspaper publisher associated with Svenska Amerikanska Posten, a Swedish language newspaper once published in Minneapolis, Minnesota, was born in Tubbemåla in Vislanda parish.

Politics
Result of the 2010 election:
 Moderate Party 30,28% 	
 Centre party 11,24%
 Liberal People's Party 4,69%	
 Christian Democrats 5,42%	
 Swedish Social Democratic Party 30,95%	
 Left Party 4,50%	
 Green Party 4,33%
 Sweden Democrats 7,82%
 Other Parties 0,76%

References
Statistics Sweden

External links

Alvesta Municipality - Official site
Coat of arms

Municipalities of Kronoberg County